Sidhnak Mahar Inamdar, also known as Sidhnak Mahar, (18th century to 19th century) was an Indian soldier of the Mahar Regiment. He belonged to the Mahar caste. He is popularly known for the Battle of Koregaon.

Early life 
Sidhnak Mahar's grandfather was gifted Kalambali village of Satara as Inaam by Peshwas for his loyalty. So Sidhnak Mahar also got this Inaam as heridetary.

Battles
Sidhnak Mahar formed a Mahar battalion. He asked Peshwas to join hands with him but the Peshwas rejected so Sidhnak Mahar joined the British Army.

Memorial 
Sidhnak Mahar's memorial Samadhi is situated in Kalambi village of Sangli district. Veer Shidhnak Foundation is a welfare trust run by his descendants Abhijeet Inamdar in Kalambi Tal.Miraj Sangli district.

Bollywood actor Arjun Rampal plays the role of Sidhnak Mahar Inamdar in The Battle of Bhima Koregaon, an upcoming biopic.

References 

Year of birth missing
Year of death missing
18th-century births
19th-century deaths
Dalit people
Marathi people
People from Maharashtra
Dalit leaders
Mahar
People from British India
18th-century Indian people
19th-century Indian people
Indian warriors